The following is an overview of 2018 in Chinese music. Music in the Chinese language (Mandarin and Cantonese) and artists from Chinese-speaking countries (Mainland China, Hong Kong, Taiwan, Malaysia, and Singapore) will be included.

Charts
List of Billboard China V Chart number-one videos of 2018
List of Global Chinese Pop Chart number-one songs of 2018

TV shows
Idol Producer (season 1) (January 19 – April 6)
Produce 101 (season 1) (April 21 – June 23)
Sing! China (season 3) (July 13 – October 7)
Singer (season 6) (January 12 – April 20)

Awards
2018 China Music Awards
2018 Chinese Music Awards
2018 CMIC Music Awards
2018 ERC Chinese Top Ten Awards (zh)
2018 Global Chinese Golden Chart Awards
2018 Global Chinese Music Awards
2018 Midi Music Awards
2018 Migu Music Awards
2018 MTV Europe Music Awards Best Chinese & Hong Kong Act: Lou Yixiao 
2018 Music Pioneer Awards
2018 Music Radio China Top Chart Awards

Debuting

Groups
 AKB48 Team SH
 Boy Story
 NEX7
 Nine Percent
 Rocket Girls 101

Releases

First quarter

January

March

Second quarter

April

May

June

Third quarter

July

August

Fourth Quarter

October

See also 

2018 in China

References

 
Chinese